James Moore (29 June 1834 – 26 June 1904) was a Bishop of Ballarat, Victoria (Australia).

Early life
Moore was born in Listowel, County Kerry, Ireland. After a preliminary training at the Collegiate School in Tralee and a six-years' course at All Hallows Missionary College, Dublin, he was ordained to the priesthood, and left immediately for Australia.

Career in Australia
Moore arrived in Melbourne in January 1859. He was soon appointed to the important pastorate of St. Francis' Church, Lonsdale Street, in that city, but, owing to failing health, took charge of the less onerous parish of Keilor. There he remained until 1865, when Archdeacon Laurence Sheil having been appointed Bishop of Adelaide, Dr. Moore succeeded him as head of the Ballarat Mission in Victoria, being appointed dean, and accompanying Archbishop James Alipius Goold to Rome in 1873, when Pope Pius IX made him Doctor of Divinity. On the erection of Ballarat into a separate diocese he was appointed Vicar-General, and on the death of Bishop O'Connor, in 1883, the Pope, who had made him one of his domestic prelates and a monsignor in 1881, first named him administrator of the diocese, and then nominated him to the succession. He was consecrated on 27 April 1884.

References

1834 births
1904 deaths
People from Listowel
Alumni of All Hallows College, Dublin
Irish emigrants to colonial Australia
Roman Catholic bishops of Ballarat